This is a list of bridges documented by the Historic American Engineering Record in the U.S. state of Illinois.

Bridges

Notes

References

List
List
Illinois
Bridges
Bridges